Knysna Local Municipality is a municipality part of Garden Route District Municipality located in the Western Cape Province of South Africa.   the population is 68,659.  Its municipal code is WC048.

Geography 
It abuts on the George Municipality to the north and west, and on the Bitou Municipality to the east.

According to the 2011 census the municipality has a population of 68,659 people in 21,893 households. Of this population, 40.9% describe themselves as "Coloured", 36.1% as "Black African", and 21.0% as "White". The first language of 51.2% of the population is Afrikaans, while 28.4% speak Xhosa and 15.4% speak English.

Most of the residents of the municipality live in the town of Knysna, which as of 2011 has a population of 51,078. Knysna is situated on the shores of the Knysna Lagoon; other coastal settlements are Sedgefield (pop. 8,361) and Buffelsbaai (pop. 71). Away from the coast are agricultural settlements at Rheenendal (pop. 3,936) and Karatara (pop. 880).

History
At the end of the apartheid era, the area that is today the Knysna Municipality formed part of the South Cape Regional Services Council (RSC). The towns of Knysna and Sedgefield were governed by municipal councils elected by their white residents. The coloured residents of Hornlee (Knysna) and Smutsville (Sedgefield) were governed by management committees subordinate to the white councils. Rheenendal was also governed by a management committee. Kwanonqaba was governed by a town council established under the Black Local Authorities Act, 1982. The coastal resorts of Buffelsbaai, Belvidere Estate, Brenton-on-Sea and Noetzie were governed by local councils.

After the national elections of 1994 a process of local government transformation began, in which negotiations were held between the existing local authorities, political parties, and local community organisations. As a result of these negotiations, the existing local authorities were dissolved and transitional local councils (TLCs) were created for each town and village. In October 1994 Knysna TLC replaced the Municipality of Knysna and Hornlee Management Committee. In December 1994 Sedgefield TLC replaced the Municipality of Sedgefield, Smutsville Management Committee and Buffelsbaai Local Council. These transitional councils were made up of members nominated by the various parties to the negotiations. In October 1995 the local councils of Belvidere Estate, Brenton-on-Sea and Noetzie, and the Rheenendal Management Committee, were all converted to TLCs without negotiations and with the existing councillors retained in office.

In May 1996 elections were held for all the TLCs. At the time of these elections the South Cape District Council was established in place of the South Cape RSC, and transitional representative councils (TRCs) were elected to represent rural areas outside the TLCs on the District Council. The area that was to become Knysna Municipality included part of the Outeniqua TRC.

At the local elections of December 2000 the TLCs and TRCs were dissolved and the Knysna Municipality was established as a single local authority. At the same election the South Cape District Council was dissolved and replaced by the Eden District Municipality. In 2011 the Hoogekraal Plantation area north of Sedgefield was transferred from George Municipality to Knysna Municipality.

Politics 

The municipal council consists of twenty-one members elected by mixed-member proportional representation. Eleven councillors are elected by first-past-the-post voting in eleven wards, while the remaining ten are chosen from party lists so that the total number of party representatives is proportional to the number of votes received. In the election of 1 November 2021 no party obtained a majority of seats on the council. The Democratic Alliance (DA) then formed a minority coalition government with the Knysna Independent Movement (KIM). At the first council meeting on 22 November 2021, the DA's Julie Lopes was elected speaker, followed by the DA's Levael Davis as mayor and Mark Willemse from KIM as deputy mayor with the help of the lone councillor from the Economic Freedom Fighters (EFF).

The following table shows the results of the 2021 election.

History
Joy Cole was first elected mayor under the DA in December 2000 but defected in the September 2004 floor-crossing to become an ANC-aligned independent and reconstituted the council under ANC control. Cole formed a broad-based coalition of the ANC and DA after the March 2006 local government elections when neither party had obtained an outright majority. After Cole resigned in December 2006 to pursue another career, Doris Wakeford-Brown of the DA formed a multi-party coalition. This short-lived coalition collapsed in May 2007 when the Knysna Civic Alliance switched allegiances to the ANC, which brought Eleanore Bouw-Spies in as the new mayor. In the September 2007 floor crossing window the two civic party councillors defected to the ANC, giving the party an outright majority of 9 seats out of 16. Bouw-Spies' term as mayor ended when the DA won an absolute majority in the 2011 election and Georlene Wolmarans was elected mayor. In the 2016 election the DA fell short of an absolute majority, but formed a coalition with the ACDP and an independent councillor. Bouw-Spies, who had crossed to the DA in 2014, returned for a second term as mayor.

Bouw-Spies was removed as mayor after an ANC-initiated vote of no confidence in June 2018. The motion was supported by two DA councillors, Mark Willemse and Peter Myers. Willemse was then elected as the new mayor with COPE member Ricky van Aswegen as deputy mayor. The DA has instituted disciplinary action against its two members, but the matter has dragged on into 2019 without a solution as of yet.

Mayors
 Charles Thobi (2002–2004)
 Joy Cole (December 2000 – September 2004) (DA)
 Joy Cole (September 2004 – March 2006) (Independent)
 Joy Cole (March 2006 – December 2006) (ANC)
 Doris Wakeford-Brown (December 2006 – May 2007) (DA)
 Eleanore Bouw-Spies (May 2007 – May 2011) (ANC)
 Georlene Wolmarans (May 2011 – August 2016) (DA)
 Eleanore Bouw-Spies (August 2016 – June 2018) (DA)
 Mark Willemse (June 2018 – present)

References

External links 
Knysna Municipality official site

Local municipalities of the Garden Route District Municipality